Euphilotes bernardino, the Bernardino blue, is a butterfly in the family Lycaenidae. The species was first described by William Barnes and James Halliday McDunnough in 1916. It is found in North America.

Subspecies
Five subspecies belong to Euphilotes bernardino:
 Euphilotes bernardino allyni (Shields, 1975) c g
 Euphilotes bernardino bernardino (Barnes & McDunnough, 1916) i g
 Euphilotes bernardino inyomontana Pratt & J. Emmel in T. Emmel, 1998 i g
 Euphilotes bernardino martini (Mattoni, 1954) i
 Euphilotes bernardino minuta Austin in T. Emmel, 1998 i g
Data sources: i = ITIS, c = Catalogue of Life, g = GBIF, b = BugGuide

References

Further reading

 

Euphilotes
Articles created by Qbugbot